Eddie Sturgis (1881–1947), also known as Edwin Sturgis, Ed Sturgis, or Edward Sturgis, was an American character actor of the silent and sound film eras. His career began in the 1916 film, The Lost Bridegroom, which starred John Barrymore. In his twenty-three year career, he appeared in over fifty films, mostly in supporting or smaller roles. His final performance would be in the 1939 Joe E. Brown vehicle, Beware, Spooks!, in a minor role. Sturgis died on December 13, 1947 in Los Angeles, California.

Filmography

(Per AFI database)

The Rainbow Princess  (1916)
The Lost Bridegroom  (1916)   	
The Moment Before  (1916)
Destiny's Toy  (1916)
A Case at Law  (1917)	
A Girl Like That  (1917)   	
Heart's Desire  (1917)
Cassidy  (1917)
At First Sight  (1917)   	
We Should Worry  (1918)
Doing Their Bit  (1918)   	
Just for Tonight  (1918)   	
Madame Jealousy  (1918)   	
Peck's Bad Girl  (1918)   	
The Racing Strain  (1918)
The Bondage of Barbara  (1919)   	
Miss Crusoe  (1919)   	
 One of the Finest (1919)	
The Peace of Roaring River  (1919)   	
A Man and His Money  (1919)	
The Dark Star  (1919)   	
The Oakdale Affair  (1919)
The Deep Purple  (1920)
Man and Woman  (1920)
Legally Dead (1923)
Ponjola (1923)
Seven Keys to Baldpate (1925)
The Blackbird (1926)
Hard Boiled (1926)
The Road to Mandalay (1926)	
Let It Rain (1927)
Wolf's Clothing (1927)
After Midnight (1927)
The Big City (1928)
Fazil (1928)
Shadows of the Night (1928)   	
Square Crooks (1928)
Outside the Law  (1930)
Shooting Straight (1930)
The Squealer (1930)
Sob Sister (1931)
The Phantom of Crestwood (1932)   	
Young America (1932)
King Kong  (1933)   	
Broadway Bill (1934)
Gentlemen Are Born (1934)
Springtime for Henry (1934)
Hell Bent for Love  (1934)
Here Comes the Groom (1934)
Man on the Flying Trapeze (1935)
Bad Boy (1935)
Frisco Kid (1935)
Red Hot Tires (1935)
Mississippi (1935)
Wanderer of the Wasteland  (1935)   	
Stolen Harmony (1935)
The Jungle Princess (1936)
Riffraff (1936)
Hell-Ship Morgan (1936)
Two-Fisted Gentleman (1936)
Beware Spooks! (1939)

References

External links

 

1881 births
1947 deaths
American male film actors
American male silent film actors
Male actors from Washington, D.C.
20th-century American male actors